Asimina incana is a species of pawpaw (genus Asimina, family Annonaceae). It usually grows 1–4 flowers per node. Its pollen is shed as permanent tetrads.

References

incana
Plants described in 1791
Trees of the United States